Bilasuvar is a city in and the capital of the Bilasuvar District of Azerbaijan. The area's considerable agricultural potential depends on irrigation. It is situated near one of the country's four border crossings with Iran.

It has been said that the city's name was called "Pileh-Swar", which meant ‘Elephant-riding Person’ in Persian language, a reference to an early emir. In Azerbaijani the name means ‘Pure Waterfalls‘.

The city is located in the Central Aran region. Biləsuvar was divided into two parts in 1828 with the Turkmanchay Treaty. The similarly-named Iranian city of Bileh Savar is located right across the border.

References

External links

World Gazetteer: Azerbaijan – World-Gazetteer.com
Agricultural development news

Populated places in Bilasuvar District